Joseph Wayne McVey IV (born January 19, 1977), better known by his stage names Z-Ro and the Mo City Don, is an American rapper from Houston, Texas. He was named one of America's most underrated rappers by The New York Times in 2007.

Early life and career
Z-Ro was born Joseph Wayne McVey IV in Houston's South Park neighborhood on January 19, 1977. When he was six, his mother died, and he was shuttled from household to household in search of stability, eventually settling in the Ridgemont area, a middle-class neighborhood in Southwest Houston near the suburb of Missouri City. When Z-Ro reached his late teens he was unemployed and resorted to drug dealing and hustling on the streets. According to Z-Ro, listening to the music of 2Pac, Geto Boys, Bone Thugs-N-Harmony, Street Military, K-Rino and Klondike Kat inspired him to work harder for his goal of leaving the streets. Z-Ro discovered his talent of freestyle rapping and after going through a couple of recording studios to make a demo, the CEO of a local label discovered and signed him.

Z-Ro released his critically acclaimed Rap-a-Lot debut titled The Life of Joseph W. McVey. The record was a huge success and helped expand Z-Ro's fan base beyond the South. In 2005, Z-Ro released Let the Truth Be Told, which was well received. Z-Ro's 2006 album I'm Still Livin' was released while he was imprisoned for drug possession, to positive reviews. It was called "a great album... powerful" but "relentlessly bleak" by The Village Voice and "one of the best rap albums to come out of Houston" by the Houston Chronicle. In 2010 he released the album titled Heroin, which was followed by an album titled Meth in 2011 and then Angel Dust in 2012.

Z-Ro released his first EP under The Mo City Don titled Tripolar on August 25, 2013, via One Deep Ent. Z-Ro then followed up with The Crown in June 2014. In February 2015, Z-Ro released his first proper studio album in three years, titled Melting the Crown.

In 2016, Z-Ro released Drankin & Drivin in August and Legendary in November under his label One Deep Entertainment.

In 2017, Z-Ro announced he was retiring and released No Love Boulevard in June as his final album. He came out of retirement 6 months later and released Codeine in December.

In 2018, Z-Ro released Sadism on November 16 under One Deep Entertainment and was distributed by EMPIRE.

In 2020, Z-Ro released an EP titled Quarantine, The Social Distancing EP with appearances from rapper Boosie Badazz, Slim Thug, Lanlawd and late rapper Wicket Cricket. He then later released an album titled Rohammad Ali on June 26.

In 2021, Z-Ro along with S.U.C. rapper Mike D released a collaboration album titled 2 The Hardway with appearances from Slim Thug, Lil' Keke, Beanz from the production duo, Beanz N Kornbread, Klondike Kat, Grace from Grace Boys, Duke Gutta, Oticia Redmond, C-Note, Big Pokey, and Lil' O.

In 2022, in a statement to XXL, Z-Ro claims Trae Tha Truth asked to talk to him outside a Houston Restaurant before he allegedly sucker punched him. After that, several men jumped in and continued to assault him.

Legal case
On July 26, 2017, Z-Ro was arrested after his ex-girlfriend, Just Brittany, accused him of beating her three months earlier. Z-Ro told the media that Brittany was using this accusation to get more publicity for herself as she is also appearing in a reality show on television. On October 10, a grand jury dropped the felony charges. The next day, the Harris County, Texas, district attorney filed misdemeanor charges against Z-Ro on the same alleged incident.

Discography

Albums
+ List of albums, with selected chart positions, showing year released and album name

References

1977 births
African-American male rappers
Southern hip hop musicians
Living people
Musicians from Houston
Rappers from Houston
Screwed Up Click members
Underground rappers
Rap-A-Lot Records artists
Gangsta rappers
21st-century American rappers
21st-century American male musicians
People from Missouri City, Texas
20th-century African-American people
21st-century African-American musicians